Leon Angelo Serafim (born May 23, 1945) is an American academic.  He is a Japanologist, linguistic historian and professor emeritus of the University of Hawaii.

The widely accepted linguistics term "Japonic languages" was coined by Serafim to identify and characterise the Japanese which is spoken on the main islands of Japan and the Ryukyuan spoken on the island of Okinawa and the Ryukyu Islands.

Early life
At the end of Serafim's studies at the University of California, Berkeley in 1968, he was awarded a B.A. in Oriental Languages.  After further study at the University of Hawaii, he earned a master's degree in East Asian Languages in 1976.  His Ph.D. in Linguistics was conferred by Yale University in 1984.

Career
Serafim is a member of faculty of the Department of East Asian Languages and Literatures at the University of Hawaii.  He is associated with the university's Centers for Japanese Studies.

Serafim was the founding Director of the Center for Okinawan Studies.  His on-going research investigates the relationship of changes in language, culture, and demography of the Ryukyus.

Selected works
In a statistical overview derived from writings by and about Leon Serafim, OCLC/WorldCat encompasses roughly 6 works in 10+ publications in 2 languages and 100 library holdings.

 Shodon: the Prehistory of a Northern Ryukyuan Dialect of Japanese (1984)
 Early Japanese Vocalism and Vowel Concord (1976)

Notes

References
 Shimabukuro, Moriyo. (2007). The Accentual History of the Japanese and Ryukyuan Languages: a Reconstruction. London: Global Oriental. ;  OCLC	149189163

University of Hawaiʻi faculty
American Japanologists
1945 births
Living people
Linguists from the United States